Little Cedar River is an  river in Gladwin County in the U.S. state of Michigan.

Pete Drain, which feeds into the Little Cedar, is also known as the Little Cedar River.

Tributaries 
From the mouth:
 (right) Otgen Drain
 (left) Snyder Drain
 (right) Hoover Drain
 (right) Crockett Drain
 (left) Dow Creek
 (left) Rich Drain
 (right) Smith Drain
 (right) Hay Drain
 (right) McMahan Drain
 (left) Martin Drain
 (right) Graham Drain
 (left) Bennet Drain
 (right) Pete Drain

References 

Rivers of Michigan
Rivers of Gladwin County, Michigan
Tributaries of Lake Huron